John Albert Kitzhaber (born March 5, 1947) is an American former politician who served as the 35th governor of Oregon from 1995 to 2003, and as the 37th governor of Oregon from 2011 until his resignation in 2015. A member of the Democratic Party, Kitzhaber was the longest-serving governor in the state's history.

Kitzhaber resigned from office on February 18, 2015, a month after he was sworn in for his fourth term. State and federal authorities were investigating criminal allegations against him and his fiancée Cylvia Hayes. Secretary of State Kate Brown succeeded him. 

In 2017, the federal government dropped its investigation against Kitzhaber without filing charges. The Oregon ethics commission found 10 instances when Kitzhaber used his political office for personal gain. He agreed to pay a settlement fine of $20,000.

A physician in Roseburg, Kitzhaber was elected to the Oregon House of Representatives in 1978. After one term, he won an Oregon Senate seat in 1980, serving three terms, until 1993. He was Senate President from 1985 to 1993.

Early life and career 
Kitzhaber was born on March 5, 1947, in Colfax, Washington, to Annabel Reed (née Wetzel) and Albert Raymond Kitzhaber. He graduated from South Eugene High School in 1965, Dartmouth College in 1969, and Oregon Health & Science University with a medical degree in 1973. Kitzhaber practiced medicine from 1973 to 1986 in Roseburg, Oregon, as an emergency physician.

Legislative career 
Kitzhaber began his political career in 1978 when he won election to the Oregon House of Representatives, where he served for one term. In 1980, he was elected to the Oregon State Senate, where he served three terms from 1981 to 1993 and was the president of the Senate from 1985 to 1993. As Oregon Senate President, he was the chief author of the state's government-funded health care plan, the Oregon Health Plan.

Governorship

First term, 1995–1999 

In 1994, Kitzhaber won the Democratic nomination for governor when the sitting governor, Barbara Roberts (also a Democrat), withdrew from the race in January of that year. Roberts opted against a second term after voters refused to pass a sales tax to fund the Oregon Health Plan and she was forced to break her campaign promise not to cut spending.

Kitzhaber won the general election in November 1994 with 51% of the vote. The Republican candidate, former Rep. Denny Smith, won 42%. He was sworn into office on January 9, 1995.

During his first term, Kitzhaber introduced the Oregon Children's Plan, which was designed to identify and assist at-risk children and their families. Despite being personally opposed to the death penalty, Kitzhaber allowed two executions to be carried out in his first term: Douglas Franklin Wright in 1996 and Harry Charles Moore in 1997. In a statement in 2011, Kitzhaber said "They were the most agonizing and difficult decisions I have made as Governor... I have regretted those choices ever since."

Second term, 1999–2003 

Republican anti-tax activist Bill Sizemore challenged Kitzhaber in 1998. Sizemore had founded Oregon Taxpayers United, a political action committee that lobbied against tax increases and promoted ballot measures limiting the use of union dues in political campaigns, in 1993.

During the general election, The Oregonian newspaper reported Sizemore's controversial business practices in his personal life, as well as in the operation of his political action committees and non-profit educational foundation.

Kitzhaber won 64% of the vote to 30% for Sizemore. Kitzhaber won 35 of 36 counties in Oregon, with only rural Malheur County on the Idaho border going for Sizemore

In his second term, Kitzhaber developed policy initiatives related to natural resources during his two terms as governor, including The Oregon Plan for Salmon and Watersheds aimed at restoring dwindling runs of threatened salmon species to Oregon's rivers and streams. The plan was a collaborative effort that encouraged federal, state and local government agencies to work with private landowners to restore watershed health and recover threatened salmon runs. Kitzhaber also took a high profile and controversial stand in favor of breaching several Northwest dams to help restore salmon populations.

Managing growth, particularly in the Willamette Valley, was a priority of Kitzhaber and he was a staunch supporter of Oregon's comprehensive land use system. He opposed attempts to weaken protection of farmland and enforcement of urban growth boundaries. Kitzhaber also created the Governor's Growth Task Force and the Willamette Valley Livability Forum to help gather accurate information and outline integrated approaches for developing sustainable communities. His related Community Solutions program attempted to focus the efforts of numerous state agencies, other governments and interested groups in collaborative problem solving and coordination to manage various community development projects across Oregon.

Under Oregon's constitution, Kitzhaber could not seek a third consecutive term in 2002. He was succeeded by Democrat Ted Kulongoski, who was elected governor in 2002 and 2006.

Interregnum, 2003-2011 
After his first tenure as governor, Kitzhaber became the director of the Center for Evidence Based Policy at the Oregon Health & Science University, served as the executive chair and president at both the Foundation for Medical Excellence and the Estes Park Institute, and founded the health care advocacy group the Archimedes Movement.

Third term, 2011–2015 

In September 2009, Kitzhaber announced that he would run for a third term as governor. He won the Democratic primary in May 2010, defeating Roger Obrist and the former Secretary of State of Oregon Bill Bradbury.

In the general election, he ran against Republican Chris Dudley, a businessman and former NBA player. Kitzhaber won a close election, 49.29% to 47.77%, with minor party candidates receiving the additional fractions.

Kitzhaber was sworn into his third term as Governor of Oregon on January 10, 2011, succeeding the Democrat who had succeeded him, Gov. Ted Kulongoski.

The 2010 election was the first time Oregon used its new cross nomination system, a form of fusion voting. In this system, a candidate for partisan public office can be nominated by up to three political parties. Kitzhaber was nominated by the Independent Party of Oregon in addition to the Democratic Party.

On November 22, 2011, Kitzhaber announced that he might commute an upcoming death sentence scheduled to occur in the month ahead. Kitzhaber went on to announce that he would allow no executions to occur in Oregon while he is governor, calling the issuing of death sentences "compromised and inequitable". The reprieved inmate, Gary Haugen, made headlines when he refused to be pardoned, wanting to be executed. Senior Judge Timothy P. Alexander, assigned to Marion County Circuit Court, ruled that Haugen could reject the governor's reprieve of his execution and move forward in his efforts to die by lethal injection. Kitzhaber appealed the decision to the Oregon Supreme Court,  which decided in the governor's favor on June 20, 2013. In 2012, Rolling Stone magazine named Kitzhaber one of "The Quiet Ones: 12 Leaders Who Get Things Done", citing his decision to halt all executions in Oregon as "demonstrating just how effective government can be".

Kitzhaber presided over the failed launch of Cover Oregon, the state's Affordable Care Act insurance exchange website. He was also disappointed in 2014 by the collapse of the Columbia River Crossing infrastructure megaproject, amid opposition from some urbanists in Portland and by Republicans in Washington's state Senate and Clark County government.

A more personal scandal struck the governor's office late in 2014 when the Willamette Week exposed a previously unknown marriage between First Lady Cylvia Hayes and an Ethiopian immigrant in 1997. Hayes admitted to the union, which was dissolved in the early 2000s, and said it was an illegal green card marriage into which she entered for money during a difficult period in her life. Kitzhaber was reportedly unaware of the marriage until the Willamette Week'''s investigation. Just days later, local news stations reported that Hayes was involved in another criminal scheme in 1997 involving a marijuana grow operation in Washington, to which Hayes also admitted.

At the same time, Kitzhaber faced questions over Hayes' consulting business and whether the first lady improperly used her position and relationship to the governor. Kitzhaber asked for an ethics review into Hayes's business activities, which the state commission declined to look into. Kitzhaber publicly defended Hayes against criticism, saying the state executive branch followed protocol with regard to her consulting work and calling her past marriage a "personal issue", although he admitted at a debate that he was "taken aback and hurt" to learn of it.

 Fourth term, 2015 

Kitzhaber ran for reelection in 2014. While he consistently led opponent Dennis Richardson, a conservative Republican state representative from Central Point, in public polling and defeated him by a margin of 5.6 percent, his campaign faced controversy over the failure of Cover Oregon and the activities of Kitzhaber's fiancée, Cylvia Hayes, with Richardson charging that the Governor and the First Lady were corrupt. Kitzhaber was cross-nominated by the Working Families Party of Oregon.

Kitzhaber was sworn in for a historic fourth term as governor on January 12, 2015. At the start of his fourth term, he enjoyed the largest Democratic majorities in the Oregon Legislative Assembly he had seen in more than 12 years as governor. In his inaugural address, Kitzhaber indicated his fourth gubernatorial term would be the last one he would seek, saying it "will complete the arc of my political career". He said he wanted to focus on socioeconomic inequality in Oregon during his last four years as governor of the state.

Hayes influence peddling scandal and aftermath

Despite his efforts to pivot toward policy, Kitzhaber continued to grapple with controversies related to his fiancée and her work as a consultant and for the state. At a press conference on January 30, 2015, he said Hayes would play no further role in his administration, although he confirmed the couple still plans to marry. The Oregonian, which endorsed him in his 2010 and 2014 campaigns, went so far as to call on him to resign, although Kitzhaber said he would not consider doing so. Major Democratic officeholders in the state, including Treasurer Ted Wheeler, Senate President Peter Courtney, and House Speaker Tina Kotek, all issued statements on February 12 urging Kitzhaber to resign. Also on February 12, the Willamette Week'' reported that Kitzhaber's executive assistant had tried to have thousands of the governor's emails deleted the previous week. The next day, February 13, Kitzhaber announced his resignation (effective February 18, 2015) amid the scandal.
 
In 2017, following 28 months of investigation, the federal government announced that it had dropped its investigation into allegations that Kitzhaber and his partner Cylvia Hayes had used their positions for personal gain. In a statement posted on his Facebook page, Kitzhaber said: 

In January 2019, Kitzhaber agreed to pay $20,000 in civil penalties to the Oregon Government Ethics Commission for conflicts of interest involving Hayes while he was governor. That month, Hayes also agreed to pay the Commission fines totaling "$44,000 for ethics violations arising from her use of public office for personal profit."

Activities outside governorship 

Kitzhaber serves as the director of the Center for Evidence Based Policy at Oregon Health & Science University in Portland, Oregon. He holds an endowed chair on health care policy at The Foundation for Medical Excellence, an educational foundation that produces continuing-education programs for physicians. Kitzhaber also serves as the president of the Estes Park Institute, a continuing-education organization for community health care leaders and hospital executives.

On January 13, 2006, Kitzhaber announced the Archimedes Movement, an organization seeking to maximize the health of the population by creating a sustainable system which uses the public resources spent on health care to ensure that everyone has access to a defined set of effective health services. The goal is to create a vision for a more equitable and sustainable system as well as the political tension necessary for its realization. A legislative proposal that took input from many Oregon residents was introduced in the 2007 Oregon legislative session.

The Oregon Better Health Act failed to pass the 2007 Legislature after Kitzhaber was unable to overcome concerns raised by AARP about his inclusion of Medicare in his plan. Another health reform bill, a Senate proposal which was amended to include portions of the Archimedes Movement bill, passed instead.

With the withdrawal of Tom Daschle's candidacy for United States Secretary of Health and Human Services, there was speculation Kitzhaber could be tapped for the position. However, Kitzhaber denied interest in the position and said that he was not being vetted.

On February 7, 2014, Kitzhaber endorsed fellow Democrat Donald Berwick for Governor of Massachusetts. On May 2, 2016, Kitzhaber announced his endorsement for Vermont Senator Bernie Sanders in his 2016 race for the Democratic presidential nomination.

Personal life

Kitzhaber is of German descent.  He married Rosemary Linehan in 1971; they divorced in 1974. He married Sharon LaCroix in 1995 and had one son, Logan, who was born in October 1997. The couple sought a divorce in 2003, soon after the end of his second term as governor.

Kitzhaber lives with his fiancée Cylvia Hayes, founder of the environmental consulting firm 3EStrategies. In August 2014, the couple announced their engagement; no wedding date has been announced.

During his political career, Kitzhaber became famous for wearing blue jeans during speaking engagements. When he wore jeans to his inauguration in 1995, he created a minor stir. During his 2010 campaign for a third term as governor, Kitzhaber frequently avoided the necktie as well, preferring a button-down shirt and suit jacket with no tie.

Kitzhaber lives and works in Portland, and declined to use the official gubernatorial residence of Mahonia Hall in Salem during his service as governor.

Electoral history

See also 
List of governors of Oregon
Governorship of John Kitzhaber

References

External links
John Kitzhaber for Governor

 

|-

|-

|-

|-

1947 births
20th-century American physicians
21st-century American politicians
American anti–death penalty activists
American emergency physicians
American people of German descent
Dartmouth College alumni
Democratic Party governors of Oregon
Living people
Democratic Party members of the Oregon House of Representatives
Oregon Health & Science University alumni
People from Colfax, Washington
Politicians from Roseburg, Oregon
Physicians from Oregon
Presidents of the Oregon State Senate
Democratic Party Oregon state senators
South Eugene High School alumni
Members of the National Academy of Medicine